Egglinton Hall is a historic home located in Milford, Sussex County, Delaware. The house was constructed by Henry Egglinton circa 1790 and is noted for its Greek Revival features, particularly the two-story porch added in 1828. Reverend Truston P. McColley, a significant figure in Sussex County history, lived in the house from 1828 until 1874. McColley preached and led Methodist churches around Milford; he was also a successful businessman who helped start the peach industry in southern Delaware and organized a railroad in Milford. In addition, McColley served as president of the 1852 Delaware Constitutional Convention.

Egglinton Hall was added to the National Register of Historic Places on January 7, 1983.

References

Houses on the National Register of Historic Places in Delaware
Greek Revival houses in Delaware
Houses completed in 1790
Houses in Sussex County, Delaware
Milford, Delaware
National Register of Historic Places in Sussex County, Delaware